Julie de Bona (born 7 December 1980) is a French actress.

Life and career

Julie has Italian and Vietnamese origins. Her father is a computer scientist and her mother is a seamstress.

She was enrolled in the faculty of biochemistry when she decided at 19 years to take a year off to try theater. She followed the course of the Montpellier Conservatory before beginning her career in the theater café and then started her first small roles in television fiction.

Filmography

Theater

References

External links

 

1980 births
Living people
21st-century French actresses
French film actresses
French stage actresses
French television actresses
French people of Italian descent
French people of Vietnamese descent